Sergey Vasilyevich Bukhteyev (born 1 January 1897 in Moscow; died in December 1947) was a Soviet Russian football player and coach.

On 1 May 1947 he was arrested and on 13 September 1947 convicted of anti-Soviet agitation and sentenced to 8 years of imprisonment, dying in the prison camp the same year. He was rehabilitated in 1956.

External links
 

1897 births
Footballers from Moscow
1947 deaths
Russian footballers
Soviet footballers
FC Spartak Moscow players
Soviet football managers
FC Torpedo Moscow managers
PFC CSKA Moscow managers
Gulag detainees
People who died in the Gulag
Soviet rehabilitations
Association football forwards